Tinct is the eighth studio album by the American experimental electronic music ensemble Biota, released in 1988 by Recommended Records.

Track listing

Personnel 
Adapted from the Tinct liner notes.

Biota
 Tom Katsimpalis – organ, guitar, bass guitar, autoharp, harmonica, recorder, bells, spoken word, production, mixing
 Mark Piersel – trumpet, guitar, banjo, sheng, psaltery, ukulele, organ, percussion, spoken word, production, engineering, mixing
 Steve Scholbe – alto saxophone, bass clarinet, flute, guitar, sheng, bells, percussion, production, mixing
 William Sharp – tape, organ, bass clarinet, percussion, spoken word, production, engineering, mixing
 Jim Steinborn – pipe organ, production, mixing
 Gordon H. Whitlow – bass guitar, guitar, piano, accordion, production, mixing
 Larry Wilson – drums, congas, bongos, bodhrán, production, mixing
 Randy Yeates – mbira, piano, production, mixing

Production and additional personnel
 Ken DeVries – cover art
 Roger Seibel – mastering

Release history

References

External links 
 Tinct at Discogs (list of releases)

1988 albums
Biota (band) albums
Recommended Records albums